Bemangidia is a monotypic genus of flowering plants belonging to the family Sapotaceae. Its only species is Bemangidia lowryi.

Its native range is Madagascar.

References

Sapotoideae
Sapotaceae genera
Monotypic Ericales genera